Herbert G. Taylor (December 20, 1906 – January 1981) was an American speed skater who competed in the 1932 Winter Olympics.

In 1932 he finished fourth in the 5000 metres event and sixth in the 1500 metres competition.

External links
 Speed skating 1932  

1906 births
1981 deaths
American male speed skaters
Olympic speed skaters of the United States
Speed skaters at the 1932 Winter Olympics